FOREX Bank is currently the market-leading foreign exchange bureau in the Nordic region. The company was started in 1927 providing currency exchange for travellers, at the main Stockholm Central train station. Legend says that it started by the owner of Gyllenspet's Barber Shop at the station, when he discovered that most of his customers were tourists in need of currency for their trips. Therefore, the barber began keeping the major currencies on hand.

The company was subsequently acquired by Statens Järnvägar, the Swedish State Railways, which expanded the operations until it was sold to Rolf Friberg in 1965. The company was for many years the only one apart from the banks that was licensed to conduct currency exchange in Sweden.

The company, which is still wholly owned by the Friberg family, has expanded into neighbouring Finland in 1993, Denmark in 1994 and Norway in 2004 and has 130 branches, principally located at railway stations or airports, but also shopping malls and high streets. In 2003, the company extended its business into retail banking and can also offer current and savings accounts including internet and mobile banking, loans, debit and credit cards, cash handling, money transfer and payments.

See also
List of companies of Sweden

References and notes

External links 

Companies based in Stockholm
Banks of Sweden
Banks established in 1927
Foreign exchange companies
1927 establishments in Sweden